The Chocolate Touch is a children's book by Patrick Skene Catling, first published in the US in 1957. John Midas is delighted when, through a magical gift, everything his lips touch turns into chocolate. The story is patterned after the myth of King Midas, whose magic turned everything he touched into gold. The original illustrations were by Mildred Coughlin McNutt, but another edition in the same year, a "newly illustrated" edition, had illustrations by Margot Apple and more pages.

Summary
John Midas is a young boy with an intense, but obsessive love of confectionery, especially chocolate. Dr. Cranium, the Midas' family doctor warns John that his health is poor, and until further notice, he is to eat only those foods that are conducive to a healthy body, much to the boy's disgruntlement. The doctor's orders are backed by John's folks, who dispose of their son's entire candy stash and have control over his spending money. Angered at having his life micromanaged, John goes for a walk to clear his head. 

Whilst on his excursion he sees a coin on the ground. John rejoices over his good fortune; having found a way to clandestinely acquire some chocolate. However, when he studies the coin he sees it is engraved with the image of a fat boy and the letters JM, and dismisses it as a unknown token. Even so, John remarks the coin is unique as JM stands for John Midas, and decides to hang on to it. Also on his walk he comes across a candy store he has never seen before. Even more odd is that the store is run by a man whom John has never met before, but is friendly and refers to John by name and extols his chocolate as the finest ever. The confectioner offers John a box of his chocolates in exchange for the strange coin. That night before going to bed, John decides to have one final chocolate feast, only to be dismayed to find the box contains nothing save for an ordinary chocolate ball. Although it is only a small piece of chocolate, it is the most chocolatey chocolate he has ever tasted. 

The next morning, John is amazed to find everything he eats tastes like chocolate, even his toothpaste and morning toast. Then, the Chocolate Touch's effects go into full swing, and whatever touches his mouth turns to chocolate. However, he cannot properly hydrate himself this way. He then gets tired of eating chocolate and yearns once again to be able to eat foods with nutrients, viewing ham sandwiches, sliced chicken, cherries and other such prosaic fare as Earth's choicest delicacies, for the first time in his young life preferring "normal food" to candy.  The boy also realizes everything he touches with his mouth transforms into chocolate, as evidenced when he turns his trumpet into a chocolate trumpet during band practice. John ruins the birthday party of his friend Susan when a game of bobbing for apples results in everyone being awash in chocolate sauce. John tells his dad he needs help. Under the impression John needs reinforcement with his diet, they go to Dr. Cranium, who prescribes a tonic - John promptly spits out chocolate syrup and a chocolate spoon, exposing John's chocolate transforming ability. Dr. Cranium then turns his attention to his own fame in the medical world, calling this "Cranium's disease", and Mrs. Midas cries when she finds out John is affected by this apparent disease. In order to comfort her, John tries to kiss his mother, but he turns her into a chocolate statue. Horrified, he rushes to the candy store, where the chocolate vendor tells him only greedy people can see the money he spent at the store. He offers John a choice between restoring his mother to normal and removing the chocolate touch and John begs him to help his mother. Recognising that John has repented, the shopkeeper promises that all the things John turned to chocolate have reverted to their original states, his friendship with Susan is repaired, and neither his parents nor Dr. Cranium have any knowledge of the chocolate transforming ability. John returns home to a quiet house and his mom once again a living human woman. Realizing as part of his reformation he ought to thank the shopkeeper for undoing all the damage, he runs back to the candy store, only to see nothing but an empty lot.

Themes
The Chocolate Touch covers roughly the same narrative as the myth of King Midas, hence the name John Midas, but in changing the object of its protagonist's desire, modifies its target in significant ways. The myth of King Midas, who loved gold above all things, targets greed as its main theme, while The Chocolate Touch highlights another of the Seven Deadly Sins, gluttony. Both stories deal with self-centeredness versus compassion, though The Chocolate Touch does so in a manner accessible to children.

Significance
The Chocolate Touch is still in print, and is often used in grade school curricula throughout the United States.  It won the Massachusetts Children's Book Award in 1989, the Utah Children's Choice Honors Award in 1983, and the Beehive Award from the Children's Literature Association of Utah in 1983.

References

1952 American novels
American children's novels
Chocolate
Classical mythology in popular culture
1952 children's books